Robert Marcin Obaz (born 8 March 1973) is a Polish politician. He was elected to the Sejm (9th term) representing the constituency of Legnica.

He was born in Jelenia Góra, Poland.

References 

Living people
1973 births
People from Jelenia Góra
Democratic Left Alliance politicians
21st-century Polish politicians
Members of the Polish Sejm 2019–2023